PowerDirector is a video editing program developed by CyberLink. PowerDirector runs on Windows 7, 8, 8.1 10, and 11 with 64-bit versions recommended and can run in Android and IOS with The App version of PowerDirector.

Editions
PowerDirector has 5 different retail editions, including Director Suite, Ultimate Suite, Ultimate, Ultra and Deluxe (aka Standard in Japan).

Version history

See also

 List of video editing software

References

Reviews (tested version in brackets):
 Journalism.co.uk (Android)
 Tom's Guide (15)
 CNET (15)
 PC Advisor (14)
 PC Magazine (14)
 PC Advisor (13)
 PC Advisor (13)
 Maximum PC (6)
 PC Magazine (2)

External links
 
 Google Playstore Page
 App Store Page

Video editing software
Video editing software for Windows